This is a list of French television related events from 1998.

Events
25 March - France Ô starts broadcasting.
12 July - France beat Brazil 3-0 to win the 1998 World Cup at Saint-Denis.

Debuts

Domestic
14 September - Cap des Pins (1998-2000) (France 2)

International
1 April - / Pocket Dragon Adventures (1998-1999) (France 3)

Television shows

1940s
Le Jour du Seigneur (1949–present)

1950s

Présence protestante (1955-)

1970s
30 millions d'amis (1976-2016)

1990s
Sous le soleil (1996-2008)
Oggy and the Cockroaches (1998-present)

Ending this year

Dimanche Martin

Births

Deaths

See also
1998 in France
List of French films of 1998